The 1856 Massachusetts gubernatorial election on November 4. Incumbent Know-Nothing Governor Henry J. Gardner was re-elected to a third term. He benefited greatly from a deal with the state's new Republican Party, which agreed not to field a candidate in exchange for Gardner's support of presidential nominee John C. Frémont. With no serious challenger in the field against him, Gardner easily defeated Democrat Erasmus Beach and George W. Gordon, an American Party member running in support of the national ticket.

This was the last election in which the Whig Party participated.

Whig convention

Candidates
 Thomas Aspinwall, former U.S. consul at London (1816–54)
 Luther Vose Bell, Superintendent of McLean Asylum and candidate for U.S. Representative in 1852 and 1854

Know-Nothing convention
The American Party convention was held at Faneuil Hall, Boston, on July 24, 1856.

Candidates
 Henry J. Gardner, incumbent Governor

General election

Candidates
 Erasmus Beach, nominee for Governor in 1855 (Democratic)
 Luther Vose Bell, Superintendent of McLean Asylum (Whig)
 Henry J. Gardner, incumbent Governor (American)
 George W. Gordon ("Fillmore American")
 Josiah Quincy Jr., former Mayor of Boston (Independent)

Results

See also
 1856 Massachusetts legislature

References

Governor
1856
Massachusetts
November 1856 events